Ouzouer-sur-Trézée is a commune in the Loiret department in north-central France. The Briare Canal and the river Trézée run through the town. A well-known mayor of the town was the French Resistance fighter and spy Count Robert de La Rochefoucauld

See also 
 Communes of the Loiret department

References

Ouzouersurtrezee